Robert Wade (born 1930) is an Australian artist.

He lectures on the heritage of Australian watercolour to many art societies around the world, and is referred to as Australia's Unofficial Ambassador of Watercolour. He authored several books including, Robert Wade's Watercolor Workshop Handbook, Painting more than the eye can see, and Painting your vision in watercolor.

References

External links
Robert Wade's Personal Webpage

Australian painters
Recipients of the Medal of the Order of Australia
1930 births
Living people